Robert F. Smith may refer to:
 Bob Smith (Australian politician) (born 1948 as Robert Frederick Smith), Australian politician
 Robert F. Smith (investor) (born 1962 as Robert Frederick Smith), American investor, the founder, chairman and CEO of Vista Equity Partners
 Robert Freeman Smith (1931–2020), American politician
 Robert Farrell Smith (born 1970), American Latter-day Saint humor writer